Out Loud is the second studio album of Slovenian rock band Naio Ssaion. It was released on 25 November 2005 by Napalm Records.

Track listing
 Static
 The Mirror
 Teen
 Miss You
 Bow Link In E Minor
 n.ss
 Shut Up
 Blah-Blah
 Blind Date
 Can't You Hear
 At Ease
 Yours Faithfully
 Out Of the Great Book of Fairytales

References

2005 albums
Naio Ssaion albums